Zakaria Nasution (born 15 May 1944) is an Indonesian former swimmer. He competed in two events at the 1960 Summer Olympics.

References

1944 births
Living people
Indonesian male swimmers
Olympic swimmers of Indonesia
Swimmers at the 1960 Summer Olympics
Sportspeople from Medan
Asian Games medalists in water polo
Water polo players at the 1970 Asian Games
Asian Games bronze medalists for Indonesia
Medalists at the 1970 Asian Games
20th-century Indonesian people